Abraham Lincoln High School is a public high school located at 2800 Ocean Parkway, Brooklyn, New York under the jurisdiction of the New York City Department of Education. The school was built in 1929, and since graduated four Nobel Prize laureates, as well as many doctors, scientists, engineers, politicians, musicians, artists, and other notable alums. The current principal is Ari A. Hoogenboom.

It was built during the Great Depression, and to save money, one set of blueprints was used for Lincoln and other high schools in New York City, including Bayside High School, Samuel J. Tilden High School, John Adams High School, and Grover Cleveland High School.

The school features five gymnasiums, an outdoor football and track and field, a swimming pool, a photography studio, an animal science lab, an office classroom and an auditorium.

History
The school was established in 1929 and named for former US president, Abraham Lincoln. From when the school opened its doors in September 1930 through the next 25 years, the school principal was Dr. Gabriel R. Mason. In 1983, Dr. Jack Pollock, the principal, reported that 8 of 10 graduates attended college and/or university.

However, by 2010, C.J. Hughes of The New York Times reported that Lincoln High School had "struggled" with student academic achievement. In 2009, the school only had a 58% graduation rating. The SAT averages for the school were 411 in reading, 432 in mathematics, and 401 in writing. The New York State averages during that year were 480 in reading, 500 in mathematics, and 470 in writing.

Admissions 
As of the 2014–15 school year, the school had an enrollment of 2,325 students and 116.0 classroom teachers , for a student–teacher ratio of 20.0:1. There were 1,506 students (64.8% of enrollment) eligible for free lunch and 85 (3.7% of students) eligible for reduced-cost lunch.

The school's racial composition is very diverse. African American students made up 38.3% of the school's student population, a plurality of the student body. White students made up over one-quarter (26.3%), Hispanic and Latino (of any race) students made up over one-fifth (21.1%), Asian American students made up 14.0%, and Native Americans made up the remaining 0.3%.

Extracurricular activities

The school offers many extracurricular activities, including Acting, Animal Care Squad Anime, Arista National Honor Society, Cheerleading, Chess, Chinese, Conflict Negotiation & Mediation,  Debate Team, Gay–Straight Alliance, Guitar, Hiking, History, Key Club, Yearbook, Library Squad, Lincoln Ambassadors, Lincoln Log (newspaper), Marine Lab Squad, South Asian club, Weightlifting, and Yearbook.

Virtual Enterprise
The school has a virtual enterprise program where students create and manage their virtual businesses from product development, production, and distribution to marketing, sales, human resources, accounting, finance, and web design.

Veterinary science
The school has a veterinary science program in which students work with live animals.

Athletics

The school offers a variety of varsity and junior varsity sports. These sports include basketball, baseball, football, bowling, cross Country, handball, track and field, lacrosse, soccer, softball, swimming, tennis and volleyball. Lincoln varsity sports games were also televised on City Gridiron.

In 2013, borough president Marty Markowitz and councilman Domenic Recchia funded a new $2 million fitness center at the school. On November 27, 2018, the school along with alumnus Isaiah Whitehead commenced the opening of a new weight room.

Lincoln athletic director Renan Ebeid was recognized by All-Stars Teachers contest by Major League Baseball.

Photography
The school has a renowned professional photography program.

Notable alumni

References

External links

 
Profile from NYC Department of Education

1929 establishments in New York City
Coney Island
Educational institutions established in 1929
Public high schools in Brooklyn
School buildings completed in 1929